Saros cycle series 139 for solar eclipses occurs at the Moon's ascending node, repeating every 18 years, 11 days, containing 71 events. It has 16 partial solar eclipses, 12 will be hybrid and 43 will be total. The first total eclipse occurred on December 21, 1843 over southern Asia and lasted 1 minute and 43 seconds. The last total eclipse will occur on March 26, 2601 over Antarctica and the Southern Ocean lasting 35 seconds.

This series is currently producing total eclipses over 4 minutes long, with each one gradually increasing in length. It will continue to do so until July 16, 2186 when it will produce the longest total eclipse calculated for the ten millennia from 3999 BCE to 6000 CE.  Starting on May 11, 2078, Saros 139 will begin producing the longest total eclipses of any series, surpassing those of Solar Saros 136 (whose eclipses are getting slightly shorter). The last eclipse in this series to occur was a total eclipse on March 29, 2006, lasting 4 minutes 7 seconds and passing over portions of Africa and western Asia. The next eclipse will occur on April 8, 2024, lasting 4 minutes 28 seconds over central North America, entering in Mexico, crossing the United States, and leaving in eastern Canada. All eclipses in this series occurs at the Moon's ascending node.

This solar saros is linked to Lunar Saros 132.

Umbral eclipses
Umbral eclipses (annular, total and hybrid) can be further classified as either: 1) Central (two limits), 2) Central (one limit) or 3) Non-Central (one limit). The statistical distribution of these classes in Saros series 139 appears in the following table.

Events

References

External links
Saros cycle 139 - Information and visualization
 NASA Saros Series Catalog of Solar Eclipses

Solar saros series